North Dallas is an area of numerous communities and neighborhoods in Dallas, Texas (United States). The phrase "North Dallas" is also sometimes used to include any suburb or exurb north of Dallas proper within the metropolitan area. The majority of North Dallas is located in Dallas County, while a small portion is located in Collin and Denton Counties. North Dallas generally includes areas of Dallas north of Northwest Highway, along with Lake Highlands and areas of Dallas north of IH-635 known as Far North Dallas. The area has strong social and economic ties to the Dallas enclave of Park Cities, and two inner suburbs of Dallas, Richardson and Addison. 

As Dallas has grown over the last several decades, the concept of "North Dallas" has changed from the area just north of downtown, along Central Expressway (where North Dallas High School is located), to the far northern reaches of Dallas proper and the suburbs to the north of the city.

Neighborhoods 
The following neighborhoods are generally considered part of or closely connected with North Dallas; however, some of them may not be located entirely within North Dallas or may be considered parts of North Dallas by some and not others.

Araglin Court
Arlington Park
Audelia
Brookshire Park
Caruth Hill
Churchill Way
Churchill Pointe
Bluff View
Devonshire
Greenway Parks
Hamilton Park
Hillcrest Forest
Janmar
Melshire Estates
North Park
Meadow Glen
Midway Crossing
Midway Hills
Midway Hollow
Pagewood
Park Forest
Preston Hollow
Stoney Crooks
Stemmons Corridor
Vickery Meadows
Waterford 
Webb Chapel

Lake Highlands

Lake Highlands, and its neighborhoods, are generally considered as part of North Dallas by people and media, while at the same time a distinct area.

 Abrams Place
 Alexander's Village
 Bill Browne's Farm
 Boundbrook Oaks Estates
 Candlewood Creek
 Caribbean Estates
 Chimney Hill
 Copperfield Community
 Country Forest
 Creekside at Lake Highlands
 Forest Highlands
 Forest Meadow
 Glen Oaks
 Hamilton Park
 Highlands West
 Highland Meadows
 High Oaks Addition
 Jackson Meadow
 L Streets
 Lake Highlands Estates
 Lake Highlands North
 Lake Highlands Square
 Lake Highlands Village West
 Lake Ridge Estates
 Merriman Park/University Manor
 Merriman Park Estates
 Merriman Park North
 Moss Farm
 Moss Meadows
 Northwood Heights
 Oak Highlands
 Oak Tree Village
 Pebble Creek
 Richland Park Estates
 Rolling Trails
 Royal Highlands
 Royal Highlands Village
 Royal Lane Village
 Stults Road
 Town Creek
 Walnut Creek Estates
 Whispering Hills
 White Rock Valley
 Woodbridge
 Woodlands on the Creek
 University Terrace
 Urban Reserve

Far North Dallas

Far North Dallas includes areas north of IH-635, and may sometimes include portions of Lake Highlands that are also north of IH-635. Sometimes, Far North Dallas is also viewed as a distinct area from North Dallas. 

 Bent Tree
 Briar Ridge
 Chalfont Place
 Chimney Hill
 Cobblestone Square
 Countrybrook
 Frankford Creek Estates 
 Frankford Meadows
 Haymeadow
 Highland Creek
 Highlands
 Hillcrest Manor
 Jackson Highlands
 Le Louvre
 Moss Creek
Northwood Hills
 Oak Tree
 Oakdale
 Park Central
 Parkway Lake Estates
 Pepperwood Estates
 Preston Creek
 Preston Fairways 
 Preston Green
Preston Highlands
 Preston North
 Preston Port Estates
 Preston Trail
 Prestonwood 
Renner
 Spring Creek
 Timberglen
 Valley View
 Whispering Springs
 Williamsburg on Preston
 Willow Falls
 Willow Greene

Shopping 
 NorthPark Center
 Galleria Dallas
 Dallas Midtown

Education

Secondary
The Collin County portion of North Dallas is served by the Plano Independent School District.

Most of the Dallas County portion of North Dallas is served by the Dallas Independent School District, and students are zoned to either Emmett J. Conrad, Hillcrest, Thomas Jefferson, or W. T. White High Schools.

All of Lake Highlands and portions of Far North Dallas in the Dallas County are served by the Richardson Independent School District. Lake Highlands students are zoned to Lake Highlands High School (Dallas) or Lloyd V. Berkner High School (Richardson), while portions of Far North Dallas are zoned to J.J. Pearce High School (Richardson) or Richardson High School (Richardson).

The Denton County portion of North Dallas is served by the Carrollton-Farmers Branch Independent School District, and students are zoned to R.L. Turner High School or Newman Smith High School.

Colleges and universities 
 Southern Methodist University (SMU) is a private, coeducational university in University Park. SMU was founded in 1911 by the Southern Methodist Church and now enrolls 6,500 undergraduates, 1,200 professional students in the law and theology departments, and 3,500 postgraduates. According to sources such as the U.S. News & World Report, SMU is the best overall undergraduate college in the Dallas-Fort Worth Metroplex and the third best in the State of Texas.
 The University of Texas at Dallas (UTD), part of the state public University of Texas System, is located in the city of Richardson, is adjacent to Far North Dallas, and is in the heart of the Telecom Corridor. UT Dallas, or UTD, is renowned for its work in combining the arts and technology, as well as for its programs in engineering, computer science, economics, international political economy, neuroscience, speech and hearing, pre-health, pre-law and management. The university has many collaborative research relationships with UT Southwestern Medical Center. UT Dallas is home to approximately 21,145 students.
Richland College, part of the Dallas County Community College District, is located within Lake Highlands. The school was founded in 1972 and is the largest school in the DCCCD, featuring nearly 22,000 students. Richland is the only community college to receive the Malcolm Baldrige National Quality Award.
Brookhaven College, part of the Dallas County Community College District, is located near Far North Dallas. Brookhaven opened in 1978, making it the newest college in DCCCD, featuring nearly 11,000 students
Texas A&M's TAMU-Dallas campus (the Texas AgriLife Research and Extension Center at Dallas) is also located in the Far North Dallas. TAMU-Dallas is the home of the Urban Living Laboratory, which is a research and urban lifestyle community built with state-of-the-art green technologies.

Libraries 
The area is served by seven branches of the Dallas Public Library system:
 Audelia Road Branch Library
 Fretz Park Branch Library
 Park Forest Branch Library
 Preston Royal Branch Library
 Renner Frankford Branch Library
 Timberglen Branch Library
 Walnut Hill Branch Library

Economy
North Dallas is home to the headquarters of Texas Instruments (TI). TI is the No. 4 manufacturer of semiconductors worldwide after Intel, Samsung and Toshiba, and is the No. 2 supplier of chips for cellular handsets after Qualcomm, and the No. 1 producer of digital signal processors (DSPs) and analog semiconductors, among a wide range of other semiconductor products.

Major business areas in North Dallas include the Platinum Corridor, Preston Center, and the Telecom Corridor.

Since 2016 both Studio Movie Grill and Pollo Campero have their headquarters in the Hidden Grove Office Building in North Dallas.

Transportation 

As the majority of North Dallas was developed in the late 20th century, the primary mode of local transportation is the automobile and the area has a low density compared with neighborhoods built in the early 20th century. Efforts made by the City of Dallas and Dallas Area Rapid Transit to increase the availability of alternative modes of transportation have received varying degrees of support from North Dallas residents. Since 1996, two light rail lines flanking North Dallas on the east have been constructed and well-received, and two more flank North Dallas on the west, in northwest Dallas. However, plans to build a commuter or light rail line through the North Dallas area along the "Cotton Belt" (the St. Louis Southwestern Railway) has met opposition from residents and local organizations.

North Dallas' road network was developed according to the street hierarchy school of urban design. Roads in the area are separated into major limited-access highways, high-capacity principal arterial roads, mid-capacity minor arterial roads, mid-capacity collector roads, and minor streets. The most organized of these systems is North Dallas' modified grid plan of principal arterial roads, which runs on a standard N/S/E/W grid.

Highways 

The routing of limited-access highways through North Dallas is based on the area's proximity to Dallas' downtown freeway loop, as Dallas' freeway system was built according to the hub-and-spoke paradigm. North Dallas' major north-south highways radiate out of the downtown freeway loop and cut through North Dallas at various angles.
  Interstate 35E runs northwest/southeast.
  Dallas North Tollway runs north/south. 
  U.S. Highway 75 (Central Expressway) runs northeast/southwest.
Additionally, four separate beltways arc across North Dallas: in order from their proximity to downtown:
  Northwest Highway (Loop 12)
  Interstate 635
  Belt Line Road
 President George Bush Turnpike

Thoroughfares 

Abrams Road 
Arapaho Road
Audelia Road
Coit Road
Forest Lane
Frankford Road
Greenville Avenue
Hillcrest Road
Inwood Road
Marsh Lane
Midway Road
Preston Road
Royal Lane
Skillman Street
Spring Valley Road
Walnut Hill Lane

Light rail 
DART began operating its light rail lines in North Dallas in 1996: The Red Line connects North Dallas to Oak Cliff, south Dallas, downtown, Uptown, Richardson and Plano. The Blue Line connects North Dallas to south Dallas, downtown, Uptown, east Dallas, Lake Highlands, and Garland. The Green Line and Orange Line lines run just to the west of North Dallas in northwest Dallas. The two lines serve DFW Airport, Irving and Las Colinas, Carrollton, Farmers Branch, the Stemmons Corridor, Victory Park, downtown, Deep Ellum, Fair Park, south Dallas and Pleasant Grove. Lines and stations in North Dallas include:
 
 LBJ/Skillman Rail Station
 Lake Highlands Station
 White Rock Station

  and 
 LBJ/Central Station
 Forest Lane Station
 Walnut Hill Station
 Park Lane Station
 Lovers Lane Station

Air 
Dallas's Love Field Airport is located in North Dallas, near the Bluff View and Devonshire neighborhoods. The Dallas-Fort Worth Metroplex's major international airport, Dallas/Fort Worth International Airport, is located a short distance to the northwest. Additionally, Addison Airport, a general aviation airport, is located adjacent to North Dallas in Addison.

See also 

 North Dallas Chamber of Commerce

References

External links 

 North Dallas Neighborhood Alliance
 TAMU-Dallas
 University of Texas at Dallas